Twennynine with Lenny White is the second album of American R&B band Twennynine, released in November 1980 on Elektra Records. The album reached No. 22 on the Billboard Top R&B Albums chart.

Overview
Twennynine with Lenny White was produced by Lenny White and Larry Dunn.

Singles
As a single, "Kid Stuff" peaked at No. 19 on the Billboard Hot Soul Songs chart. "Fancy Dancer" reached No. 17 on the Billboard Hot Dance Club Play chart and No. 25 on the Hot Soul Songs chart.

Track listing

References

1980 albums
Twennynine albums
albums produced by Lenny White
Elektra Records albums